Diogenes James Angelakos (July 3, 1919 – June 7, 1997) was an American electrical engineer and professor emeritus of electronic engineering at the University of California, Berkeley, who served as the director of the Electronics Research Laboratory for 20 years. He is credited with building up the research group into one of the university's biggest research labs. He is considered a pioneer in the fields of microwaves, antennas and electromagnetic waves.

Engineering career 
He graduated from University of Notre Dame with a BS in electrical engineering in 1942 and his MS (1946) and PhD (1950) in the same field from Harvard University. In 1964, he was appointed director of the Electronics Research Laboratory at the University of California, Berkeley.

He was a Fellow, and later a Life Fellow, of the Institute of Electrical and Electronics Engineers and an honorary member of the Hellenic Physical Society. Among his awards were the "Greek Independence Medal for Technical Assistance to Greek Science", the "Axion Award of the Hellenic-American Professional Society of California" and an award from the Directors of the Joint Services Electronic Program of the United States Department of Defense. He was also recipient of the Berkeley Citation, Berkeley University's highest award.

Unabomber 
On July 2, 1982, Angelakos was the victim of a pipe bomb left by Ted Kaczynski, the "Unabomber", at an electrical engineering and computer science faculty lounge in Cory Hall. He was injured in the face and right hand, but recovered nearly completely. After surgery he was able to re-learn how to write, but the powder burns left by the bomb were permanent. Fourteen years on, he expressed bafflement at the bomber's motives, saying that "If someone has a message to give to the world, you can't get it across by killing people. I just don't understand him at all. He must have some mental problems."

Three years later, he was among the first people on the scene and administered first aid when another of Kaczynski's bombs exploded and injured Berkeley graduate student John E. Hauser, a U.S. Air Force captain. Angelakos used his necktie as a tourniquet to stem the bleeding in Hauser's arm.

Personal life 
Angelakos was born in Chicago. His wife Helen Hatzilambrou died on August 1, 1982, after 36 years of marriage, and he had two children. He died of prostate cancer at his home in Berkeley in 1997. He was a adherent of the Greek Orthodox Church.

References

1919 births
1997 deaths
20th-century American engineers
American electrical engineers
Electrical engineering academics
Engineers from Illinois
Harvard School of Engineering and Applied Sciences alumni
Microwave engineers
Survivors of terrorist attacks
UC Berkeley College of Engineering faculty
Unabomber targets
Notre Dame College of Engineering alumni
Deaths from cancer in California
Deaths from prostate cancer